Mila Pavićević (born 1988) is a Croatian writer. She was born and raised in Dubrovnik, and studied at the University of Zagreb. Active in writing from an early age, she won the EU Prize for Literature for her book Ice Girl and Other Fairy-tales.

References

1988 births
Croatian writers
Living people
21st-century Croatian women writers
Croatian women writers
Date of birth missing (living people)